Ratchaburi may refer to
the town Ratchaburi, Thailand
Ratchaburi Province, Thailand
Ratchaburi district (Amphoe Mueang Ratchaburi)
Diocese of Ratchaburi
Monthon Ratchaburi
Ratchaburi Mitr Phol F.C.